Dispiron is a genus of worms belonging to the family Neoechinorhynchidae.

Species:

Dispiron catlai 
Dispiron heteroacanthus 
Dispiron mugili

References

Neoechinorhynchidae
Acanthocephala genera